Wyman Richardson (3 August 1896, Marion, Massachusetts – 1953, Boston) was an American physician, medical school professor, amateur naturalist, and author, known for his 1947 book The House on Nauset Marsh.

His father was the noted surgeon Dr. Maurice Howe Richardson. Wyman Richardson graduated with A.B. from Harvard University in 1917 and went on to earn an M.D. from Harvard Medical School. He married Charlotte Blake Richardson and was the father of several children. The family made frequent trips to their Cape Cod vacation home, which became the source of Dr. Richardson's literary fame.

The House on Nauset Marsh
Richardson's 1947 book The House on Nauset Marsh is a collection of essays that were previously published in The Atlantic Monthly during the 1940s. Along with Thoreau's 1865 Cape Cod, Beston's 1928 The Outermost House, and Hay's 1963 The Great Beach, Richardson's book is considered a regional classic in Cape Cod nature writing. The house of the book's title is a marsh-side farmhouse purchased by Maurice Howe Richardson and two other family members. The house, still owned by the Richardson family, is now within the boundaries of the Cape Cod National Seashore. The Nauset Marsh Trail is open to the public.

The book was originally published in Boston by the Atlantic Monthly Company. The first edition was reprinted in 1955 by W. W. Norton in New York and in 1972 by Chatham Press in Old Greenwich, Connecticut. The division Countryman Press of W. W. Norton published an edition in 1997 and a 50th anniversary edition in 2005.

References

1896 births
1953 deaths
Harvard University alumni
Harvard Medical School alumni
20th-century American physicians
American nature writers
American male non-fiction writers